Lewsey is a suburb of Luton, about  west north-west of the town centre, and a ward of the Borough of Luton, in the ceremonial county of Bedfordshire, England. The suburb is roughly bounded by Leagrave High Street to the north, Dunstable Road to the south, Poynters Road, Dunstable to the west, and the M1 to the east.

History
Lewsey derives its name from the Lucy family, who owned the land Lewsey is built on, as well as neighbouring Lewsey Farm and Lewsey Park. The Lucy family owned the manor from 1305 to 1455. The manor then passed to the Wingate family who were the lords of the manor of Toddington. The old manor house stood partly in the parish of Luton and partly in the parish of Houghton Regis; most of the manor buildings were destroyed by fire in 1832.

Lewsey is much older than both Lewsey Farm and Lewsey Park, first built on land off Dunstable Road in the 1950s along with the hospital. At this time it was a fairly rural suburb, surrounded by farmland on all sides, including the original Lewsey Farmhouse to the north. The estate is characteristic of its time, consisting of a mixture of square, large windowed houses and a large number of bungalows of a similar style, many of the bungalows with a bay window at the front.

Local area 
Near the centre of Lewsey is the Luton and Dunstable University Hospital, which serves Luton and the rest of its urban area, including Dunstable and Houghton Regis.

Lewsey is served by two churches; St. Hugh's C. of E. Church on Leagrave High Street and a chapel of the Church of Jesus Christ of Latter-day Saints on Poynters Road. Lewsey also has a post office on Dunstable Road.

Schools 
Ferrars Junior School
Ferrars Nursery
The Ferrars Academy
The Chalk Hills Academy
Seabrook Day Nursery

Politics
Lewsey is part of the larger Lewsey ward, which also includes Lewsey Farm and Lewsey Park. The ward is represented by Cllr Jacqui Burnett (Labour), Cllr Aslam Khan (Labour) and Council leader Cllr Hazel Simmons (Labour). The ward forms part of the parliamentary constituency of Luton North and the MP is Sarah Owen (Labour).

Local attractions

Local newspapers
Two weekly newspapers cover Lewsey, although they are not specific to the area.

They are the:
 Herald and Post
 Luton News

References

Areas of Luton
Wards of Luton